The Nihilist Spasm Band (NSB) is a Canadian noise band formed in 1965 in London, Ontario.  The band was founded by Hugh McIntyre, John Clement, John Boyle, Bill Exley, Murray Favro, Archie Leitch, Art Pratten, and Greg Curnoe. Leitch has since retired, Curnoe was killed in a bicycle accident in 1992, and McIntyre died of heart failure in 2004. The band members are mostly local artists. They were one of the artists named on the Nurse with Wound list

The term "spasm band" refers to a band that uses homemade instruments. Most of the NSB's instruments are modifications of other instruments, or wholly invented by the members. In addition to the homemade instruments, members are encouraged to improvise.  The range of the improvisation is such that instruments are not tuned to each other, tempos and time signatures are not imposed, and the members push the ranges of their instrumentation by engaging in constant innovation and ever-increasing volume over the course of a performance.

Zev Asher's documentary film What About Me: The Rise of The Nihilist Spasm Band premiered at the Toronto International Film Festival in 2000. Drawing from the inspiration of finding a copy of the Nihilist Spasm Band's first L.P. No Canada in the pile of 1970's ephemera in his family's basement; the documentary explores the legacy of the NSB as Canadian noise music pioneers.

Discography
 The Sweetest Country This Side of Heaven (vinyl single, 1967; reissued on CD, 1996), Arts Canada
 No Record (vinyl LP, 1968; reissued on CD, 1996; reissued on vinyl, 2000), Allied Record Corporation
 Vol. 2 (vinyl LP, 1979; reissued on CD, 1996), Music Gallery Editions
 1984 (audiocassette, 1984; reissued on CD, 1999), Chimik Communications
 ¬x~x=x (vinyl lp, 1985; reissued on CD, 1996), United Dairies Records
 What About Me (CD, 1992), Alchemy Records
 Live in Japan (CD, 1997), Alchemy Records
 Every Monday Night (CD, 1999), Alchemy Records
 No Borders with Joe McPhee (2xCD, 2001), Non Musica Rex
 NSB Live at Western Front (CD, 2006), NSB
 No Nihilist Spasm Band in Mulhouse (vinyl LP, 2007), Les Mondes Mental
 No Borders to No Borders with Reynols (CD, 2007), Disques Hushush
 Live In Geneve, Switzerland October 2006 with Fossils (cassette, 2007), Wintage Records & Tapes
 theBESTweCANdo (best-of compilation) (CD, 2008), NSB
 Nothing is Forever (LP, 2013), Wintage Records & Tapes, WRT-99
 Breaking Wind (LP, 2013), Rekem Records, Rekem 04
 No Record (vinyl LP re-re-release, 2014), Pacemaker Entertainment, Ltd., LION LP-136
 Fluxus (vinyl Split-LP with Kommissar Hjuler, 2015), Psych. kg
 Last Concert in Japan (CD, 2016), Alchemy Records, TECH-24486

Appears on
 No Music Box — No Music Festival 1998 (6-CD box set, 1998), Entartete Kunst Recordings
 no99 — No Music Festival 1999 (5-CD box set, 1999), Entartete Kunst Recordings
 No Nothing — No Music Festival (6-CD box set, 2000), Non Musica Rex

Members
John Clement – guitar, bass guitar, drums
John Boyle – kazoo, thumb piano, drums
Bill Exley – vocals, cooking pot
Murray Favro – guitar
Art Pratten – "pratt-a-various," water-pipe

Guest performers
Aya Onishi – drums, kazoo, "constant guest performer" since 1999
Owen Curnoe - Drums
Mark Favro - Casio keyboard
Galen Curnoe - guitar
Tim Glasgow

Previous members
Hugh McIntyre – bass guitar (1965–2004)
Archie Leitch – slide clarinet (1965–?)
Greg Curnoe – kazoo, drums (1965–92)

References

External links

 20centsMUSIC — Record label of the Nihilist Spasm Band
 Official Nihilist Spasm Band website
 [ Nihilist Spasm Band allmusic entry]

Musical groups established in 1965
Musical groups from London, Ontario
Canadian experimental musical groups
Free improvisation ensembles
Canadian art rock groups
Noise musical groups
1965 establishments in Ontario